William Melville Clemensen (June 20, 1919 – February 18, 1994) was a pitcher in Major League Baseball. He played for the Pittsburgh Pirates.

He graduated from Santa Cruz High School in 1935, where he was halfback on the football team, a starter on the basketball team, and a pitcher for the baseball team. He graduated when he was sixteen.

References

External links

1919 births
1994 deaths
Major League Baseball pitchers
Pittsburgh Pirates players
Baseball players from New Jersey
Sportspeople from New Brunswick, New Jersey
Hutchinson Larks players
Knoxville Smokies players
Gadsden Pilots players
Albany Senators players
St. Paul Saints (AA) players
Columbus Red Birds players
Sacramento Solons players

Santa Cruz High School alumni